This article contains a sortable table listing all lakes and lagoons of Nicaragua. The table includes all still water bodies, natural or artificial,  regardless of water volume or maximum depth.

See also 

 Lake Nicaragua
 Lake Managua

Notes and references

Nicaragua

Lakes